Fedorivka may refer to several places in Ukraine:

Fedorivka, Novoukrainka Raion, Kirovohrad Oblast
Fedorivka, Luhansk Oblast
Fedorivka, Vinnytsia Raion, Vinnytsia Oblast
Fedorivka, Zhmerynka Raion, Vinnytsia Oblast
Fedorivka, Polohy Raion, Zaporizhzhia Oblast